Dick Oxtoby (born 5 September 1939) was an English footballer, who played as a centre half in the Football League for Bolton Wanderers and Tranmere Rovers.

He died in June 2020 at the age of 80.

References

1939 births
2020 deaths
Footballers from Chesterfield
Association football defenders
English footballers
Bolton Wanderers F.C. players
Tranmere Rovers F.C. players
Runcorn F.C. Halton players
Lancaster City F.C. players
English Football League players
English football managers
Ashton United F.C. managers